Hamilton Heights School Corporation is a public school district serving the northeastern rural communities in Hamilton County, Indiana.

Schools
The schools lie between the two largest communities, Cicero and Arcadia.
 Elementary school (grades P-4)
 Middle school (grades 5-8)
 High school (grades 9–12)

Athletics
The Hamilton Heights mascot is the husky. Its colors are white, orange, and brown.

Notable alumni

Ryan White
The school system came to national prominence in 1987 when Ryan White, a hemophiliac who contracted AIDS via a blood transfusion, enrolled as a student.  In contrast to his previous school, Western School Corporation in Kokomo, Indiana, which had attempted to segregate him from the student population, Hamilton Heights welcomed Ryan and prepared its students with AIDS education courses.  The school was praised for its openness and courage, drawing national news coverage.  When Ryan succumbed to his illness in 1990, many students attended his funeral.

Sterling Weatherford
Sterling Weatherford was a two star recruit coming out of HHHS, and signed with the Miami RedHawks, in Ohio. He now plays for the Chicago Bears.

References

External links
 

School districts in Indiana
Education in Hamilton County, Indiana